Donald Maxwell may refer to:
 Donald Maxwell (illustrator)
 Donald Maxwell (baritone)